Pyrrhopoda elegans is a species of flower chafers, a group of scarab beetles, comprising the subfamily Cetoniinae. It is found in Madagascar.

References

External links 
 

 
 Pyrrhopoda elegans at insectoid.info

Cetoniinae
Insects of Madagascar
Beetles of Africa
Beetles described in 1879